Oukhellou is a surname.  Notable people with the surname include:

 Yazmin Oukhellou, British television personality in TOWIE
 Adam Oukhellou, British television personality in Ex on the Beach